Kingsmill was a French vessel launched in 1793 under a different name, captured in 1798, and sold to British owners who renamed her. She then became a slave ship, making three voyages from Africa to the West Indies. A French privateer captured her in 1804, but she returned to her owners in 1804. In 1807 she became a West Indiaman. In 1814 she became the first ship to trade with India under a license from the British East India Company (EIC) after the EIC lost its monopoly on British trade with India. She was badly damaged in 1821 and subsequently disappears from the registers.

Career
Kingsmill first appeared in Lloyd's Register (LR) in 1798 with T. Mullin, master, H. Mullin, owner, and trade Liverpool—Africa. Her burthen appeared as 310 tons, but that was corrected to 510 tons in the 1799 volume.

Captain Thomas Mullion acquired a letter of marque on 10 May 1798. Because of her size, Kingsmill was rated as having a legal capacity of 560, or 850 slaves.

Mullion sailed Kingsmill to the Bight of Biafra and Gulf of Guinea islands. From there she took her slaves to Martinique. She left on 4 July, and on 22 January 1799 Kingsmill was reported to be off the coast of Africa, with destination Dominica. She was still of the coast on 22 January. By 16 April she was at Martinique with destination Liverpool. She apparently carried 650 slaves, the second largest number of all Liverpool slave ships that sailed between 5 January 1798 and 5 January 1799.

For reasons that are not clear Mullion acquired a second letter of marque on 10 July 1799. In 1800 he made a second slaving voyage to the Bight of Biafra and Gulf of Guinea islands and then Martinique. On 24 January 1800 Kingsmill was at Liverpool, with destination the Windward Coast. On 18 April she was still at Liverpool, with destination Bonny (Bight of Biafra). By 28 November Kingsmill was at Bonny with destination Martinique.

In 1803 Captain J. Tobin sailed Kingsmill on her third slaving voyage. He too sailed to the Bight of Biafra and Gulf of Guinea islands, but took his slaves to the Bahamas. She delivered 395 slaves on 19 April 1803. She was one of only four slave vessels to bring slaves from the Bight of Biafra to the Bahamas, and all four came from Bonny and arrived in 1802–1803. 

From here on there is a period where Kingmills history becomes ambiguous. On 27 February 1804, Captain John Moon received a letter of marque. He did not appear in Lloyd's Register or the Register of Shipping, but the Kingsmill of the letter is of 500 tons, and there is only one other contemporary Kingsmill, and she is of 148 tons.

Lloyd's List (LL) reported on 26 June 1804 that the French privateer Buonaparte captured Kingsmill as she was sailing from Liverpool to Barbados and took her into Guadeloupe.  Captain Moon was killed in the engagement. 

In the table below, columns two through four are from Lloyd's Register, and columns five through seven  are from the Register of Shipping.

It is not clear how Kingsmill returned to her owners' hands. The fact that she did suggests that she was recaptured relatively quickly. In 1806 Swann & Co. purchased Kingsmill.

On 17 September 1808 Swann & Co. sold Kingsmill to Humble & Holland. Captain John Hanley acquired a letter of marque on 20 September 1808. The data in the table below is from Lloyd's Register.

Captain John Brown acquired a letter of marque on 8 May 1810. In 1811 John & Robert Gladstone & Co. purchased Kingsmill. (John Gladstone was father of the future Prime Minister William Ewart Gladstone.) 

In 1814 Kingsmill became the first vessel to sail to India after the EIC lost its monopoly on trade with India. She sailed after George Canning wrote on 16 May 1814 to Secretary of the Admiralty John Wilson Croker requesting an exemption for her from the requirement that vessels travel in convoy. She had missed the convoy and Croker argued that Gladstone would suffer a substantial financial loss if she had to await the next convoy. Croker further argued that Kingsmill was well-armed and so would not be vulnerable to attacks from most privateers.

Kingsmill, A. Cassels, master, sailed on 22 May and returned 15 months later with a profitable cargo. Thereafter she traded between Liverpool and Bengal. By 1818 R. M'Dowall had replaced Cassels as master.

Fate
Lloyd's List reported on 9 February 1821 that Kingsmill, Purnell, master, ran aground on the North Bank while sailing from Liverpool to Valparaiso. She was gotten off and taken into King's Dock, where her cargo had to be unloaded as she had sustained much damage. At one point she had four feet of water in her hold, but it was believed that the dry goods were not injured. Kingsmill is not listed after 1821.

Notes, citations, and references
Notes

Citations
 
References
 
 
 

 
 
 
 
 

1793 ships
Ships built in France
Captured ships
Liverpool slave ships
Age of Sail merchant ships
Merchant ships of the United Kingdom
Maritime incidents in February 1821